The 2004 Men's Floorball Championships were the fifth men's Floorball World Championships. It was held in May 2004 in Switzerland, and won by Sweden.

Championship results

Preliminary round

Group A

Group B

Placement round

9th place match

7th place match

5th place match

Final round

Semi-finals

Bronze medal match

Championship match

Leading scorers

Ranking

Official 2004 Rankings according to the IFF

All-star team
Goalkeeper:  Henri Toivoniemi
Defence:     Jari-Pekka Lehtonen,  Jakob Olofsson
Forward:     Mathias Hofbauer,  Niklas Jihde,  Mika Kohonen

See also
2004 Men's World Floorball Championships B-Division
2004 Men's World Floorball Championships C-Division

External links 
Official site
Tournament Statistics

Mens World Floorball Championships, 2004
Floorball World Championships
International floorball competitions hosted by Switzerland
Mens World Floorball Championships
Kloten
Sports competitions in Zürich
Mens World Floorball Championships
21st century in Zürich